The 1966 French Grand Prix was a Formula One motor race held at Reims on 3 July 1966. It was race 3 of 9 in both the 1966 World Championship of Drivers and the 1966 International Cup for Formula One Manufacturers. The race was the "60th Anniversary race" of Grand Prix racing, which had started with the GP of France in 1906. It was also the 16th and last time the French Grand Prix was held on variations of French highways near Reims, following a three-year absence from the region.

The race was won by the 1959 and 1960 World Champion, Australian driver Jack Brabham, driving his Brabham BT19. It was Brabham's eighth Grand Prix victory and his first since the 1960 Portuguese Grand Prix, six years earlier. It was also his first win since establishing his Brabham team, and the first win for the Australian-developed Repco V8 engine. Brabham became the first driver to win a World Championship Grand Prix in a car bearing his own name. British driver Mike Parkes finished second in a Ferrari 312, 9.5 seconds behind, while Brabham's team-mate, New Zealander Denny Hulme, finished third in his Brabham BT20, albeit two laps down.

Brabham now led the Driver's Championship on 12 points, two ahead of Ferrari driver Lorenzo Bandini and three ahead of BRM's Jackie Stewart and Ferrari's John Surtees. The win was the first of four in succession for Brabham as he began his march towards his third world title.

Race summary
Jim Clark was a non-starter, recovering from an accident after he was hit in the eye by a bird during practice. Qualifying was firmly in the hands of Ferrari and especially Lorenzo Bandini with a pole set at 2:07.8 in his 3-litre 312/66, averaging 146.112 mph (233.780 km/h). After the start, Bandini duly led, with Jack Brabham in what would later be nicknamed his 'Old Nail' BT19 – which had a bit less straightline speed – following in his slipstream for a while. Mike Parkes, who had taken over at Ferrari from John Surtees acquitted himself well, duelling with Graham Hill for third place, becoming second when Hill's camshaft broke.  When the Italian had to retire due to a broken throttle linkage, Brabham took first place at the finish – his first win since the 1960 Portuguese Grand Prix and the first driver to win a championship Grand Prix in his own car. It was also the last race ever at Reims-Gueux, the original venue of the Formula One French Grand Prix.

1950 World Champion Nino Farina died in a car accident while on his way to watch this race.

Classification

Qualifying

Race

Championship standings after the race

Drivers' Championship standings

Constructors' Championship standings

References

French Grand Prix
French Grand Prix
European Grand Prix
1966 in French motorsport